The Königshafen ("king's harbour") is the northernmost bight of the North Frisian island of Sylt in the German state of Schleswig-Holstein and thus also the northernmost bay in Germany. The harbour was used until at least the 18th century and was later abandoned as it silted up.

Location 
The bay has an area of roughly 4.2 km² and opens towards the east onto the Wadden Sea; it is only separated from the open North Sea to the west by a spit which is just 300 metres wide. In the Königshafen lie the small uninhabited island of Uthörn with its bird reserve, and the Lister Haken.

History 
The natural harbour formed by the bight was valued in the past as a safe haven on the North Sea coast. In the Middle Ages, it was the most important port-of-call between the Danish town of Skagen to the north and the mouth of the River Elbe to the south Thus, for centuries, the Danish kings held Listland as a royal enclave.

However, according to contemporary accounts, the Königshafen began to silt up in the 18th century and became unusable for shipping. Until the mid-1980s NATO conducted regular air-to-ground firing exercises in the area.

Today
Since 1985 the Königshafen has been part of the Schleswig-Holstein Wadden Sea National Park and access on foot or by vehicle is only permitted under certain conditions. Part of the bay in the northwest of the Königshafen is today a popular wind surfing area.

Bays of Schleswig-Holstein
Bays of the North Sea
Sylt